Beams is a Japanese clothing brand, established in 1976 in Harajuku district of Tokyo, whose chief executive officer (CEO) is Yo Shitara. The brand has stores in Japan, and branch offices in  New York, Milan, London, and Paris.

About

Beams department stores carry products such as interior goods, furniture, galleries, clothing, shoes, and accessories. Beams clothing department offers shoes, bags, accessories, men's and women's casual, as well as custom tailored pieces. Beams logo and artwork are seen as abstract and have a cartoonish look.

In June, 2017 Beams has collaborated with McDonald's to manufacture a limited edition of Bigmac themed t-shirts, hats, iPhone 7 covers.

History
In May 2005, Beams expanded its business internationally. The next store they opened up was located in Hong Kong and began as a woman's clothing shop. In 2006, the company expanded again to a number of different locations. Their most recent store opened in March 2015 in Bangkok.

References

External links 

 Beams official site

Clothing retailers of Japan
Clothing brands of Japan
1976 establishments in Japan
Retail companies based in Tokyo
Retail companies established in 1976